Bakshish Singh (14 June 1928 – 21 September 1970) was an Indian field hockey player who won the gold medal at the 1956 Summer Olympics. He studied at Khalsa College, Amritsar and served in the Punjab Police from 1948 to 1961.

References

External links
 
June Birthdays

1928 births
1970 deaths
Field hockey players at the 1956 Summer Olympics
Indian male field hockey players
Field hockey players from Punjab, India
Olympic field hockey players of India
Olympic gold medalists for India
Olympic medalists in field hockey
Asian Games medalists in field hockey
Field hockey players at the 1958 Asian Games
Medalists at the 1956 Summer Olympics
Asian Games silver medalists for India
Medalists at the 1958 Asian Games
Recipients of the Arjuna Award